Carex yunnanensis is a tussock-forming species of perennial sedge in the family Cyperaceae. It is native to parts of  Yunnan and Sichuan provinces in China.

See also
List of Carex species

References

yunnanensis
Taxa named by Adrien René Franchet
Plants described in 1895
Flora of Yunnan
Flora of Sichuan